DFM may refer to:

 D. F. M. Strauss (born 1946), South African philosopher
 Department of Family Medicine
 Deputy First Minister (disambiguation)
 Design for manufacturability, engineering term
Design for manufacturability (IC), specifically related to integrated circuits
 DetonatioN FocusMe, a Japanese professional League of Legends team
 Diesel Fuel Marine, also known as NATO F76
 Digital First Media, newspaper publisher
 Dimensional Fact Model, a conceptual model for Data Warehouse design in computer science
 DFM Engineering, an American telescope manufacturer
 Dongfeng Motor Corporation, one of the Chinese "Big Four" state-owned automakers
 Dubai Financial Market, a stock exchange in the United Arab Emirates
 The Distinguished Flying Medal, a British military decoration
 DFM RTV INT (radio station), an international audio-art radio station
 DFM (radio station), a Russian radio station
 Dynamic force microscopy, an alternative name for non-contact atomic force microscopy